...And the Rest Will Follow is the fifth studio album by American rock band, Project 86, released on September 27, 2005 by Tooth & Nail Records.

Track listing

Personnel
Alex Albert – drums
Ben Kaplan – programming, producer, engineer
Kelly Kerr – photography
Dean Maher – engineer
Project 86 – producer
Andrew Schwab – vocals
Randy Torres – guitar, keyboards, programming, vocals
Steven Dail – bass
Josh Wilbur – mixing

References

Project 86 albums
2005 albums
Tooth & Nail Records albums